Marcelo López de Azcona (died 10 November 1653) was a Spanish Catholic prelate who served as Archbishop of Mexico (1651–1653).

Biography
On 31 December 1651, Marcelo López de Azcona was selected by the King of Spain and confirmed by Pope Innocent X on 29 April 1652 as Archbishop of Mexico. On 25 July 1653, he was consecrated bishop by Juan Merlo de la Fuente, Bishop of Comayagua. He served as Archbishop of Mexico until his death on 10 November 1653. While bishop, he was the principal consecrator of Juan Garcilaso de la Vega, Bishop of Santiago de Guatemala (1653).

References

External links and additional sources
 (for Chronology of Bishops) 
 (for Chronology of Bishops) 

1653 deaths
17th-century Roman Catholic archbishops in Mexico
Spanish Roman Catholic bishops in North America
Roman Catholic archbishops of Mexico (city)
Bishops appointed by Pope Innocent X